Blart: The Boy Who Didn't Want To Save The World is a fictional comedy novel by Dominic Barker. It was published in 2006, by Bloomsbury Publishing Plc in Great Britain. It tells the tale of Blart, a young boy on a pig farm, who refuses to save the world. The book is largely a light-hearted parody of the fantasy genre. However, the plot and humour both become darker as the book progresses. It won the 2007 Stockton Children's Book of the Year Award.

Plot summary 

Blart is a young and quite unattractive boy, who lives on a small pig farm with his grandfather. All he cares about is himself and pigs. One day, Capablanca, a very proud and powerful wizard, arrives on Blart's grandfather's doorstep. He tells Blart that he is destined to save the world, by destroying the great Zoltab. Still, selfishly, Blart refuses. But, by force, Blart is swept up from his home and sent on a perilous quest around the land, fighting the forces of evil. He meets many strange characters, some even stranger than him! And it all leads up to one final confrontation with the evil Zoltab and his most powerful minions...

Characters

Main characters
Capablanca : A powerful wizard, who lets no one else forget it with his constant bragging, Capablanca is the one who finds and forcibly takes Blart on his quest. His eyes shine crystal-blue when he uses his magic. He has little patience for Blart, but many threats to turn him into things seem to set him right!
Blart : Our cowardly hero, who just wants to be with his pigs! Blart is a 14-year-old illiterate pig farmer who suddenly discovers from the most powerful wizard in the world, Capablanca, that he is the only boy who can save the world from the second coming of the evil lord Zorab, currently vanquished to the underworld after betraying creation.
Beowulf : Beowulf accompanies Blart and Capablanca on their quest. He wields a large sword, and is constantly trying to prove himself worthy of knighthood by saving damsels in distress and other activities which pretty much ends him up in trouble, killing Princess Lois' pet dragon being one of them. He constantly tells Blart he will cleave him into two (sometimes extending to the others). Unfortunately for the others, singing is both his hobby and greatest failure. He is ignorant and tends to sulk a lot, but he is a great warrior and a great benefit to Blart's quest.
Pig the Horse : The unfortunately named Pig is a flying horse. The party captured the horse, and Capablanca rode the horse off a cliff to force it to learn to fly, nearly getting the party "splattered on rocks" to aid the company on their quest. Unfortunately, Blart is given the honour of naming it...
Princess Lois : The loud and obnoxious princess of Illyria out matches Blart in rudeness. She has flaming red hair and is rather aggressive by nature. One of her favourite actions happens to be slamming doors, and she is adamant about never marrying. Her only friends are the dragons of Illyria, one of which Beowulf unfortunately kills. She joins the company to see the world. Blart shows feelings towards her, her rudeness channelling this.
Tungsten' : A dwarf warrior from beneath the ground, Tungsten also becomes a member of the company. A brave warrior wielding a mallet, his only wish is for iron to become the most valuable metal of all. Then, his tribe would rule the silver and gold mines as well. He is the Ambassador of the Iron Mines.
Zoltab : One of the seven lords of the earth, he betrayed the others to take over the world. He was eventually locked away in the Great Tunnel of Despair after his eventual defeat, but the cult of Zoltab plot to free the evil lord. Being yet another unwelcome suitor for Princess Lois, having children was supposedly to extend the Zoltab bloodline. However, he fails both conquer of the world and marriage when he gets splattered with the blood of Blart's brother.
Famine, Disease, Pestilence and Death : These four warriors are The Four Horsemen of Zoltab. Each spreads the effects of its name across the lands. They all wield separate weapons, each horrible in their own way. Famine is described as tall and gaunt with skin stretched tautly over his bones, showing his unquestionable lack of nutrition, and wields a spear. Disease is covered in sores and boils with yellow pus flowing from scabs on his face. Black bile also flows from his nose, and carries a mace. Pestilence is surrounded by a swarm of wasps and mosquitoes, each with their own poisonous stings, and is armed with a trident and a net. Death, the most deadly and powerful is naught but a skeleton on a horse and grins evilly while wielding a great sword. Apparently, touching Death's sword and bone results in instant death.
The Master : The Master is Zoltab's number two. Both he and Zoltab are almost equally powerful and strike fear into people's hearts. The Master hides a terrible secret...

Minor characters

Wattle and Daub : Wattle and Daub are Blart's grandfather's prized pigs, and Blart's best and only friends. When Blart is parted from them they are killed and sliced. Blart cries because of this.
The Landlord : The new, mysterious landlord of the Jolly Murderers Inn is secretly a minion of Zoltab. He, along with a band of other Minions, attack the company in their rooms. When defeated, the landlord severs his own tongue off, refusing to divulge any information.
Mr. Cheery : The real owner of the Jolly Murderers Inn. He is locked up in his own inn by Zoltab's minion.
Nimzovitsch : A wizard as powerful as Capablanca and an old friend of his, the company visits him for information on Zoltab. They find him covered and trapped in goo. Apparently, this is the outcome of a stew he attempted to make...
Mr. Motte and Mr. Bailey : Two definite Minions of Zoltab, they get Beowulf drunk to extract information on the company's quest.
The Dragons of Illyria : The five dragons of Illyria (one blue, one red, one black, one green and one multicoloured) are the only friends of Princess Lois (or the only friends she wants). Unfortunately, Beowulf, wanting to become a knight, severs the tail of the multicoloured one, killing it.
The King and Queen of Illyria : This couple are the rulers of Illyria, the stereotypical paradise. In the story, a beggar was said to attempt to beg in Illyria only to find that he had become the third richest man in Illyria the second day and therefore had to retire. The two are equally nice and refuse to believe that anything is that bad, refraining from using words such as "war", "accusation" and "crime" to suggesting they shower Zoltab and his minions with fruits or get him in a counselling session to solve the questor's problem. Their palace is the home of the map to the Great Tunnel of Despair.
The Clerk : The sour-looking clerk of Illyria is secretly a Minion of Zoltab, dispatching information to Zoltab from the palace of Illyria. He holds the key to the room containing the map to the Great Tunnel of Despair. When found out, he, like the landlord, severs his own tongue off.
Acrid : Acrid is a female dwarf, crushed and killed underneath Blart when he falls into the dwarf mines.
Yucky : The angry father of the late Acrid, he attempts to kill Blart. Seconds before his attack on Blart, he is crushed and killed by a falling Capablanca.
Porg : A dwarf advisor to Emperor Squat, he captures Blart and Capablanca and takes them to see the emperor. He is a nervous dwarf, and fears the mere name of Zoltab.
Emperor Squat : Squat is the dwarf emperor of the Iron Mines, and is constantly referred to as "your bulkiness". He sentences Blart and Capablanca to death without trial when Blart makes fun of his short stature.
The Chief : The Chief is the one who commands the diggers who are digging to free Zoltab. When Blart and Capablanca are captured and sent to work, the current chief is a large, burly man with a whip. He is killed by The Master, when the expected amount of daily work is not completed. Blart is then selected to become the new chief, but the work ends abruptly afterwards.
Maroczy : Maroczy is a Minister of Zoltab. He, along with The Master, foresees the return of Zoltab.
Blart's brother : The actual chosen one, it was he who was destined to kill Zoltab. But, unfortunately, he had already sworn his allegiance to Zoltab. He is killed when one of Zoltab's soldiers magically transforms into a dragon and crushes him.

Sequels
A sequel entitled Blart II: The Boy Who was Wanted Dead or Alive - Or Both was released in the United States and the UK in 2007, and a third volume entitled Blart III: The Boy Who Set Sail on a Questionable Quest was published in 2008.

Reception

The novel was generally well received. The Guardian praised it as being "inventive, charming and very funny" with a "satisfying ending". The Dominion Post said it had "some truly laughable scenes" and the Birmingham Post noted that it would appeal to young Terry Pratchett fans. The Times also chose it as one of their Top Easter Reads, describing it as "hilarious".

References

2006 British novels
2006 fantasy novels
British fantasy novels
British comedy novels
Children's fantasy novels
Bloomsbury Publishing books
Novels by Dominic Barker
British children's novels
2006 children's books
Dwarves in popular culture